Marks Peak is the ultimate summit, at  high, on the south side of the crater rim of Mount Hampton, in the Executive Committee Range of Marie Byrd Land, Antarctica. It was mapped by the United States Geological Survey from surveys and U.S. Navy trimetrogon photography, 1958–60, and was named by the Advisory Committee on Antarctic Names for Keith E. Marks, an electronics engineer at the National Bureau of Standards, and a member of the Marie Byrd Land Traverse Party, 1959–60.

References

Mountains of Marie Byrd Land
Executive Committee Range